Makarovo is a rural locality (a village) in Tukayevsky Selsoviet, Aurgazinsky District, Bashkortostan, Russia. The population was 9 as of 2010. There are 4 streets.

Geography 
Makarovo is located 33 km north of Tolbazy (the district's administrative centre) by road. Andreyevka is the nearest rural locality.

References 

Rural localities in Aurgazinsky District